Ties Evers (born 14 March 1991) is a Dutch professional footballer who plays as a right back for VVSB in the Dutch Derde Divisie.

Club career
He made his professional debut for De Graafschap on 22 September 2010 against FC Utrecht and the club loaned him to AGOVV Apeldoorn for the 2012-13 season. He joined FC Volendam in summer 2014.

On 1 September 2019, Evers joined VVSB in the Derde Divisie on a contract until the summer 2020.

References

External links
 
 
 Profile - Voetbal International

1991 births
Living people
People from Doetinchem
Footballers from Gelderland
Association football fullbacks
Dutch footballers
De Graafschap players
AGOVV Apeldoorn players
FC Volendam players
Eredivisie players
Eerste Divisie players
Derde Divisie players
VVSB players